Owj Arts and Media Organization ('Owj' means Climax) is legally a media non-governmental organization in Iran, active in launching campaigns, film production and distribution.

Ideology and affiliation 
The organization's works has been described as irritating government of Hassan Rouhani and reformists, anti-Iran deal, anti-American, and subject to Holocaust denial.

Owj organization seems reluctant to provide details about its owner(s) or corporate structure. Its website "About Us" section reads: "perhaps more important and better than knowing when Owj was established and who were its founders, … it is better to introduce its nature and identity". The organization has been claimed to have ties with Islamic Revolutionary Guard Corps. In 2018, Owj's executive director and Ebrahim Hatamikia, a director working for the organization publicly admitted that the organization is run and funded by the IRGC.

Notable works

Billboard campaign 

“Be With Us, Be Safe” (2012–13): The high-context billboard, installed near the busy Valiasr square of Tehran, shows then-U.S. President Barack Obama standing next to Shemr—a shi'ite villain—and offering a letter of protection to the reader. A BBC Persian-style caption reads “Be with us, be safe”. 
 “The US Government Styles Honesty [sic, Persian title: American Honesty]” (2013): While nuclear negotiations were ongoing, several posters were installed in Tehran streets, displaying Iranian and American diplomats sitting at the table, with the American side wearing a suit with  military pants and boots and pointing a gun towards the Iranian negotiator, who looked like Mohammad Javad Zarif. The billboards were soon removed after becoming controversial. 
 “A Single Blossom Does Not Bring Spring: More Children, A Happier Life” (2013–14): Billboards carrying the slogan began to pop up along major highways, targeting the former slogan of family planning in Iran: “Fewer children, better life” and encouraging more children in the family. The posters were heavily criticized for their view on role of mother in family.
 “Know The Shemr of Your Time” (2014)

Short animation 
Becharkh ta Becharkhim (2015): Roughly translated as 'two can play that game', the animation aired on state-run TV's children's channel IRIB Children symbolically narrates the "honorific" Iran's nuclear program and the "desperate" negotiations from its own point-of-view. The animations depictates Mr. Sam as the villain and characters loosely based on Iranian figures, who are members of the family of "Agha Joon" (Khamenei), such as the compromiser "Uncle Hassan" (Rouhani), the persevering "Uncle Mahmoud" (Ahmadinejad) and the coward "Uncle Mohammad" (Khatami). The animation sparked controversy in April 2016.

Documentary 
Roaring Waters (2013): Directed by Lebanese filmmaker Mohammad Dabouq about power of Navy of the Army of the Guardians of the Islamic Revolution

Feature film 
Bodyguard (2016)
Standing in the Dust (2016)
The Holy Cast (2016)
Never (2016)
Damascus Time (2018)
The Lost Strait (2018)
Naela (TBA)
Tayyeb Khan (TBA)
Conspiracy Theory (TBA)
23 People (2019)
Exodus (2020)

Festival 
 1st Down With USA Great Award (2013)
 3rd International Holocaust Cartoon Competition (2016): co-organized with Sarcheshmeh Cultural Center

References 

Organizations established in 2011
2011 establishments in Iran
Cultural organisations based in Iran
Iranian propaganda organisations
Film production companies of Iran
Animation studios